Microbiston is a genus of moths in the family Geometridae described by Staudinger in 1882.

Species
Microbiston lanarius (Eversmann, 1852)
Microbiston turanicus Staudinger, 1892
Microbiston phaeothorax Wehrli, 1941

References

Bistonini